The 1934 All-Southern Conference football team consists of American football players chosen by the Associated Press (AP) and United Press (UP) for the All-Southern Conference football team for the 1934 college football season.

All-Southern Conference selections

Quarterbacks
 Ace Parker, Duke (AP-1)

Halfbacks
 Corky Cornelius, Duke (AP-1)
 Charlie Shaffer, North Carolina (AP-1)

Fullbacks
 Norwood Sothoron, Maryland (AP-1)

Ends
 Earl Wentz, Duke (AP-1)
 Dave Thomas, VPI (AP-1)

Tackles
 Jim Tatum, North Carolina (AP-1)
 Gus Durner, Duke (AP-1)

Guards
 George T. Barclay, North Carolina (AP-1)
 Jack Dunlap, Duke (AP-1)

Centers
 Steve Sabol, NC State (AP-1)

Key
AP = Associated Press

UP = United Press

See also
1934 College Football All-America Team

References

All-Southern Conference football team
All-Southern Conference football teams